Since January 1987, the Africa Muslims Agency also known as Direct Aid International operated in 29 countries in Africa and one of the key elements of Africa Muslims Agency since January 1987, has been to institutionalise Relief work. Africa Muslims Agency played a key role in the 80’s in bridging the gap in South Africa between the indigenous population and the donor community.

In South Africa, as well, over the past 30 years Africa Muslims Agenyc/Direct Aid International has established itself as a trustworthy, dependable organisation that supports the underprivileged in Southern Africa and on the Continent of Africa, when it comes to winter projects, ramadhaan feeding, disaster relief, we can point to many successors eg: Somalia in the 90’s, Sudan, Kenya, Mozambique floods, drought stricken areas, thousands of masjids, water projects that are currently being done in Niger, Mozambique and Malawi.

One of the key focus points of AMA is to inspire the act of giving, when you think about it, the whole concept is that we want people to understand that it is important to empower the next generation, to develop leadership, to develop young people and to develop their thinking and their mindset for a world that didn’t exist 30 years ago, back then the world was a different place but now we have to adapt to the changing times and the changing landscape around us, grow, change and develop, the youth that we are working with currently are going to be experiencing a very different world in another few years from now, therefore we need to be thinking about that, in preparing the youth for a world 30 years from now.

Over the last 30 years, Alhamdulillah, it has grown into an magnanimous organisation that has built thousands of waterwells on the Continent of Africa, hundreds of Schools and Educational Facilities, multiple number of hospitals/clinics as well a few fully fledged universities, many orphanages where thousands of orphaned children that are supported through AMA/DAI programmes all over africa, many bursaries are also given, we can point to many success stories of people that have grown tremendously because they have come through the AMA educational programme.

For 30 years, the Africa Muslim Agency has been a beacon of hope to communities in Africa.

Alhamdulillah by the grace of Allah, when Dr Summait established AMA in Kuwait in 1982 his vision was for the entire continent of Africa. In South Africa we are unique in a way that South Africa became a home to the charitable work and noble work of Africa Muslims Agency. On this note we have to say shukran to the donors from South Africa, to the people that encouraged us and supported us throughout the 30 years of Africa Muslims Agency and to the first founder if AMA, Dr A.R. Summait (R.A) and then to our late brother Mohammed Farid Choonara (R.A).  He was the first director who saw the potential and capacity of S.A and its muslim donors and muslim community at large.

The role that Africa Muslims Agency South Africa played in Malawi, Mozambique and Somalia when the first drought crisis took place. Africa Muslims Agency, with the support, communication, collaboration and co-operation with the donors played a major role in fundraising the campaign. The aim was to take food to Somalia and Alhamdulillah it was the most successful campaign in the history of time in the decade of that time, that is about 20 years ago. It was the first time that the South African Muslim Community collected their efforts, their potential and their resources to send relief aid to Africa in such a huge convoy.

We have offices in 29 countries around Africa, four thousand full time staff members for when a crisis happens in a certain area, we want an office there to assist the people on the ground to be able to continue work even after the media has left, even after the bottle neck is released. When a disaster happens everybody floods there, why? It’s necessary to release the pressure of what’s going on but when the pressure is released people’s lives are not changed immediately.  It needs sustainable projects.  You need to build, dig boreholes, drill waterwells, build masjids, build classrooms, we need that to create dawah, to bring people to the religion of Islam and to be able to educate them.  We need that sustainability but we need people on the ground in order to sustain that.

There is a collective effort between donors implementing organisations and the beneficiaries that is bringing all the elements together and is creating a developing society, energetic society, progressive society and bringing the generations together for a more progressive way of life.

AMA South Africa, 30 years ago, brings to memory the apartheid days, the young generation today don’t even know how we were living those days, how the country was being projected in the world and how the underprivileged people of this country were living.  The most difficult part of those days, the barrier the apartheid regime put and made between different races so nobody knows what other races were experiencing.

One of the things that Africa Muslims Agency did, was break this barrier and integrate with the underprivileged particularly in this example – in Lenasia where the squatter camps were, nobody could reach them or integrate with them, but Alhamdulillah with the vision and wisdom of Late M.F.Choonara, the founder of the office in Johannesburg, with the support of the team of AMA, managed to communicate with the leadership of those communities.

To come to that for the first time in the history, it was a milestone, it was a pacesetter for us and for all others that came to do the job.  At that time it was not possible to come to that areas, to enter those areas and to talk to those people, Alhamdulillah Africa Muslims Agency with Late brother M.F Choonara, his vision, his mission, his sacrifice, his commitment managed to break all those barriers and we managed to put the first school in that location and the change that took place and after that people could follow suit and could say “oh, if that is possible for AMA we could also do the same and then the other areas started in Laudium Pretoria and later in Erasmia. The Sadaqah E Jaariyah is for the donors who donated towards the building of those schools and for the staff and leadership of AMA and their beneficiaries till today they continue making dua and how many generations.  For 30 years they are benefitting from that school and they will continue to benefiT.

See also
 Islam in Africa

References

Islamic organizations based in Kuwait